Fred Young is a retired businessman and conservative donor.

Education and career
Young earned a bachelor's degree from Cornell University in 1964, and an MBA and master's degree in engineering from Cornell in 1966.

Young served as president and CEO of Young Radiator, a company founded by his father in 1927. Young sold the company to MotivePower in 1999, after which he retired as CEO.

Political activities
In 2012, Young donated $100,000 to The Club for Growth Action, a conservative Super PAC. Young has supported other conservative groups and candidates, including Scott Walker. Young serves on the boards of the Cato Institute and the Reason Foundation. In 2013, Young filed a lawsuit challenging Wisconsin's campaign finance contribution limits.

Fred Young Submillimeter Telescope
In 2020, the CCAT-p telescope, whose construction Fred Young had supported for over 2 decades and with over US$16 million, was renamed the Fred Young Submillimeter Telescope (FYST).

References

Living people
Businesspeople from Racine, Wisconsin
American chief executives of manufacturing companies
Samuel Curtis Johnson Graduate School of Management alumni
Cornell University College of Engineering alumni
Cato Institute people
Year of birth missing (living people)